Eduardo Alberto Gomes Costa (born 24 July 1954) is a Mozambican former sprinter. He competed in the men's 100 metres at the 1980 Summer Olympics.

References

External links
 

1954 births
Living people
Athletes (track and field) at the 1980 Summer Olympics
Mozambican male sprinters
Olympic athletes of Mozambique
Place of birth missing (living people)